Irganay is a rural locality (a selo) in Untsukulsky District, Republic of Dagestan, Russia. The population was 2,286 as of 2010. There are 12 streets.

Geography 
Irganay is located 9 km southeast of Shamilkala (the district's administrative centre) by road. Balakhani is the nearest rural locality.

References 

Rural localities in Untsukulsky District